Šamac, formerly Bosanski Šamac is a town and municipality located in the northeastern part of Republika Srpska, an entity of Bosnia and Herzegovina. There are also small, uninhabited, parts located in Odžak municipality and in Domaljevac-Šamac municipality, Federation of Bosnia and Herzegovina.

As of 2013, the town has a population of 5,390 inhabitants, while the municipality has 17,273 inhabitants. It is situated on the right bank of the Sava river. Across the river is Slavonski Šamac in Croatia.

History
The city was founded by Bosnian settlers from Ottoman province of Smederevo in 1862. It was part of the Ottoman province of Bosnia by the time it was annexed by Austro-Hungarian Empire in 1887. After World War I, the city became part of the Kingdom of Yugoslavia. From 1929 to 1939, it was part of Drina Banovina; and from 1939 until 1941 it was part of the Banovina of Croatia. During World War II, Šamac, as all the rest of Bosnia-Herzegovina, was included into Nazi-controlled Independent State of Croatia. After 1945, the city was reintegrated within the Socialist Republic of Bosnia and Herzegovina in Tito's Yugoslavia.

In the early stages of the Bosnian war the town was occupied by Bosnian Serbs who established the provisional municipal government. Most Bosniaks and Bosnian Croats were ethnically cleansed between April and November 1992. During the war, a semi-permanent front line was established against Croatian and Bosniak forces towards the neighboring Orašje. In 2003, three Bosnian Serb town leaders at the time of the Yugoslav Wars were sentenced in ICTY for crimes against humanity.

The town lies on an important strategic position in Republika Srpska, near Brčko.
As with most other places under Serb control, Srpska authorities removed the "Bosnian" adjective from the town's official name and changed it to "Šamac". Bosniaks and Bosnian Croats continued to refer to it by its historical name of "Bosanski Šamac". causing tension among the inhabitants. A court order had the official name changed to simply Šamac, removing any ethnic divisions in its previous names.

Settlements
Aside from the town of Šamac, the municipality includes the following settlements:

 Batkuša
 Brvnik
 Crkvina
 Donja Slatina
 Donji Hasić
 Gajevi
 Gornja Slatina
 Gornji Hasić
 Grebnice
 Kornica
 Kruškovo Polje
 Lugovi
 Novo Selo
 Obudovac
 Pisari
 Srednja Slatina
 Škarić
 Tišina
 Zasavica

Demographics

Population

Ethnic composition

Economy

The following table gives a preview of total number of registered employed people per their core activity (as of 2016):

Sport
The local football club, FK Borac Šamac, plays in the third tier-Second League of the Republika Srpska.

Notable people

 Milica Babić-Jovanović (1909–1968), costume designer at the Serbian National Theatre
Ljubo Miloš (1919–1948), Croatian World War II official and concentration camp commandant executed for war crimes
 Alija Izetbegović (1925–2003), first President of Bosnia and Herzegovina
 Sulejman Tihić (1951–2014), Bosniak member of the Presidency of Bosnia and Herzegovina
 Zoran Đinđić (1952–2003), former prime minister of Serbia
 Srebrenko Repčić (b. 1954), former football player
 Predrag Nikolić (b. 1960), chess Grand Master
 Stevo Nikolić (b. 1984), footballer
 Mario Mandžukić (b. 1986), footballer

See also
Municipalities of Republika Srpska
Šamac oil field

Notes

References
 Official results from the book: Ethnic composition of Bosnia-Herzegovina population, by municipalities and settlements, 1991. census, Zavod za statistiku Bosne i Hercegovine - Bilten no.234, Sarajevo 1991.

External links

 

 
Populated places in Šamac, Bosnia and Herzegovina
Bosnia and Herzegovina–Croatia border crossings
Cities and towns in Republika Srpska